The 1982 New Mexico State Aggies football team was an American football team that represented New Mexico State University in the Missouri Valley Conference during the 1980 NCAA Division I-A football season. In their fifth year under head coach Gil Krueger, the Aggies compiled a 3–8 record. The team played its home games at Aggie Memorial Stadium in Las Cruces, New Mexico.

Schedule

References

New Mexico State
New Mexico State Aggies football seasons
New Mexico State Aggies football